Sabine Wehr-Hasler (born 2 August 1967) is a German snowboarder. She was born in Offenbach am Main. She competed at the 1998 Winter Olympics, in halfpipe.

References

External links 
 

1967 births
Living people
Sportspeople from Offenbach am Main
German female snowboarders
Olympic snowboarders of Germany
Snowboarders at the 1998 Winter Olympics
Snowboarders at the 2002 Winter Olympics
21st-century German women